The National Legion (archaic Norwegian: Den Nationale Legion) was a short-lived fascist political party in Norway led by Karl Meyer, in existence from 1927–28, notable for being the first fascist party in the country.

History

The party was founded at a public meeting at a circus, Cirkus Verdensteatret, in Oslo in May 1927. The event was hosted by the party's leader, Karl Meyer, "Norway's strongest man", a businessman and stock trader with a history of fraud cases. Author and social commentator Erling Winsnes was another leading figure.

Influenced by Italian Fascism, Meyer sought a "March on Oslo", with a parade of "100.000 farmers" that would make "the walls of Jericho crumble". The party however failed to mobilise much beyond Oslo's bourgeois West End. It ran a list in Oslo for the 1927 parliamentary election, but did not win any representation with 1,210 votes, about 1% of the vote in Oslo and 0.1% nationwide. Besides meetings at the circus, the party had little impact, and was dissolved in early 1928 amid internal conflicts and public brawls.

References

Further reading
 

Political parties established in 1927
1927 establishments in Norway
Political parties disestablished in 1928
1928 disestablishments in Norway
Defunct political parties in Norway
Far-right political parties in Norway
Fascist parties